Udea argoscelis is a moth of the family Crambidae. It is endemic to the Hawaiian islands of Kauai, Oahu, Molokai and Hawaii.

The larvae feed on Rumex giganteus.

External links

Moths described in 1888
argoscelis
Endemic moths of Hawaii